Těšín Theatre is a theatre in the town of Český Těšín, Czech Republic.

It is unique because it comprises two ensembles, Czech and Polish; plays are presented in both the Czech and Polish languages. The Polish ensemble serves the Polish minority in the Czech Republic. Together with ensembles in Vilnius and Lviv it is one of the few theatres outside Poland which has a professional Polish ensemble.

History
The theatre was founded in August 1945. It changed its name several times. The current one is from 1991. Until 1961 it operated in several places in the town. In 1961 the new building was built and the theatre was relocated there.

Directors
 Antonín Kryška (1945-1946)
 Jan Macháček (April 1946-May 1946)
 Antonín Brož (June 1946-December 1946)
 Jan Macháček (1946-1949)
 Josef Zajíc (1949-1960)
 František Kordula (1960-1972)
 Libuše Kišová (deputy) (1972-1973)
 Ladislav Slíva (deputy) (1973-1974)
 Josef Srovnal (1974-1976)
 Józef Wierzgoń (1976-1990)
 Ladislav Slíva (1990-1996)
 Roman Rozbrój (1996-2000)
 Karol Suszka (2000-2018)
 Petr Kracik (2018- )

References

External links
 

Theatres in the Czech Republic
Český Těšín
Buildings and structures in the Moravian-Silesian Region
Tourist attractions in the Moravian-Silesian Region
1945 establishments in Czechoslovakia
Theatres completed in 1945
20th-century architecture in the Czech Republic